The Boys Singles of the tournament 2016 BWF World Junior Championships is held on November 8–13. The defending champions of the last edition is Lu Chia-hung from Chinese Taipei

Seeded

Draw

Finals

Top Half

Section 1

Section 2

Section 3

Section 4

Section 5

Section 6

Section 7

Section 8

Bottom Half

Section 9

Section 10

Section 11

Section 12

Section 13

Section 14

Section 15

Section 16

References

2016 BWF World Junior Championships